The Ministry of Finance is the Sudanese government ministry which oversees the public finances of Sudan.

Ministers
This is a list of Ministers of Finance of Sudan:

Hammad Tawfiq Ahmed, November 1955 - February 1956
Ibrahim Ahmed, February 1956 - November 1958
Abdul Majid Ahmed, November 1958 - November 1963
Mamoun Mohamed Behery, November 1963 - October 1964
Mubarak Zarrouk, October 1964 - April 1965
Ibrahim Al-Mufti, May 1965 - July 1965
Sharif Hussain Al-Hindi, July 1965 - July 1966
Hamza Mirghani, August 1966 - May 1967
Sharif Hussain Al-Hindi, May 1967 - May 1969
Mansour Mahjoub, May 1969 - July 1970
Mohamed Abdel Halim Omar, July 1970 - April 1972
Musa Al-Hassan Al-Hassan, April 1972 - October 1972
Ibrahim Alyas, October 1972 - May 1973
Ibrahim Menem Mansour, May 1973 - January 1975
Mamoun Mohamed Behery, February 1976 - February 1977
Al-Sharif Al-Khatim, February 1977 - September 1977
Othman Hashem Abdel Salam, March 1978 - August 1979
Badreddine Suleiman, August 1979 - November 1981
Ibrahim Menem Mansour, November 1981 - December 1984
Abdel-Rahman Abdel-Wahab, December 1984 - April 1985
Awad Abdul Majeed, April 1985 - January 1986
Ahmed Tayfour, January 1986 - April 1986
Bashir Omar Fadlallah, May 1986 - January 1988
Omar Nour Al-Dayim, May 1988 - June 1989
Sayed Ali Ahmed Zaki, July 1989 - April 1990
Abdul Rahim Mahmoud Hamdy, April 1990 - October 1993
Abdullah Hassan Ahmed, October 1993 - April 1996
Abdul Wahab Othman, April 1996 - January 2000
Mohamed Khair Al-Zubair, January 2000 - February 2001
Abdul Rahim Mahmoud Hamdy, February 2001 - May 2002
Zubair Ahmed Al-Hassan, June 2002 - February 2008
Awad Ahmed Al-Jazz, February 2008 - May 2010
Ali Mahmood Abdel-Rasool, June 2010 - June 2013 - ?
Badr Al-Din Mahmoud Abbas, ? - December 2013 - May 2017
Mohamed Osman Al-Rikabi, May 2017 - September 2018
Mutaz Musa, September 2018 - February 2019
Mustafa Youssef, February 2019 - March 2019 
Magdi Hassan Yassin, March 2019 - September 2019
Ibrahim Al-Badawi, September 2019 - July 2020
Hiba Mohamed Ali Ahmed, July 2020 - February 2021
Gibril Ibrahim, February 2021 - October 2021
Gibril Ibrahim, November 2021 -

See also
Cabinet of Sudan
Economy of Sudan

References 

Economy of Sudan
Finance ministers of Sudan
Sudan
Finance